At-Taysiyah Natural Reserve is a protected area in Saudi Arabia managed by the Saudi Wildlife Authority.

Overview 
The natural reserve is situated to the north-eastern of Saudi Arabia with an area of 4272.2 km². It was designated as a natural reserve in 1995.

Nature 
The geographic patterns of the reserve include dune areas, shallow valleys and steppe desert. Due to its nature, the reserve becomes a destination for migrant houbara bustards during the winter. The reserve is also home to Reem Gazelle, Ostrich, and Arabian oryx.

See also 

 List of protected areas of Saudi Arabia

References 



Protected areas of Ha'il Region